The order of precedence for members of the Sejm (parliament) of the Polish–Lithuanian Commonwealth was created at the same time as the Commonwealth itself – at the Lublin Sejm in 1569. The Commonwealth was a union, in existence from 1569 to 1795, of two constituent nations: the Crown of the Kingdom of Poland (commonly known as Korona, or "the Crown") and the Grand Duchy of Lithuania. The union's legislative power was vested in a diet (assembly) known as the Sejm which consisted of the three Estates of the Sejm: the monarch, holding the titles of King of Poland and Grand Duke of Lithuania; the Senate; and the House of Deputies.

The order of precedence indicated where senators and deputies would sit during parliamentary sessions and in what order they cast their votes. The order was also followed at other formal occasions, such as royal coronations. The order of precedence remained almost unchanged from its inception in 1569 until the ultimate partition of Poland in 1795. The only changes were made to reflect the addition of new territories as the Commonwealth expanded eastwards during the 16th and 17th centuries. Territitorial losses incurred during Poland's decline in the second half of the 17th and throughout the 18th century had less bearing on the composition of the Sejm, as titular senators and deputies continued to sit in the parliament despite the loss of the lands they officially represented.

Senators 
The Senate traced its roots to the royal privy council and consisted of individuals appointed by the king to specified senatorial offices. The senatorial offices may be divided into three types:

 ecclesiastical, that is the entire Roman Catholic episcopate (all bishops and archbishops) of the Commonwealth;
 territorial, that is voivodes, or regional governors, and castellans, or caretakers of castles;
 ministers of the royal and grand-ducal cabinets, for the Crown and for Lithuania respectively.

Bishops, voivodes and castellans of major cities were considered greater senators (senatorowie więksi), or chair senators (senatorowie krzesłowi) as they were entitled to sit in designated armchairs during the Senate's sessions. The remaining lesser senators (senatorowie mniejsi) were also known as bench senators (senatorowie drążkowi) as they were sitting wherever they could find a place behind the chair senators.

The Archbishop of Gniezno, Poland's first capital city until 1038, also holding the title of Primate of Poland, was the highest ranking senator who also served as an interrex (an acting king) during a vacancy of the royal throne. The Castellan of Kraków, Poland's capital until 1596, was the highest ranking secular senator. His precedence before the Voivode of Kraków dated back to a rebellion led by Voivode Skarbimir in 1117, for which Duke Boleslaus the Wrymouth punished him by blinding and by making his office inferior to that of the local castellan.

Deputies 

Deputies elected in local sejmiks.

See also
 Administrative division of the Polish–Lithuanian Commonwealth
 Offices in the Polish–Lithuanian Commonwealth
 Polish order of precedence

References

 
 

Polish–Lithuanian
 
Politics of the Polish–Lithuanian Commonwealth